UV excision repair protein RAD23 homolog B is a protein that in humans is encoded by the RAD23B gene.

Function 

The protein encoded by this gene is one of two human homologs of Saccharomyces cerevisiae Rad23, a protein involved in nucleotide excision repair (NER). This protein was found to be a component of the protein complex that specifically complements the NER defect of xeroderma pigmentosum group C (XP-c) cell extracts in vitro. This protein was also shown to interact with, and elevate the nucleotide excision activity of 3-methyladenine-DNA glycosylase (MPG), which suggested a role in DNA damage recognition in base excision repair. This protein contains an N-terminal ubiquitin-like domain, which was reported to interact with 26S proteasome, and thus this protein may be involved in the ubiquitin mediated proteolytic pathway in cells.

Role in DNA repair
The complex of XPC-RAD23B is the initial damage recognition factor in global genomic nucleotide excision repair (GG-NER).  XPC-RAD23B recognizes a wide variety of lesions that thermodynamically destabilize DNA duplexes, including UV-induced photoproducts (cyclopyrimidine dimers and 6-4 photoproducts ), adducts formed by environmental mutagens such as benzo[a]pyrene or various aromatic amines, certain oxidative endogenous lesions such as cyclopurines and adducts formed by cancer chemotherapeutic drugs such as cisplatin. The presence of XPC-RAD23B is required for assembly of the other core NER factors and progression through the NER pathway both in vitro and in vivo. Although most studies have been performed with XPC-RAD23B, it is part of a trimeric complex with centrin-2, a calcium-binding protein of the calmodulin family.

Epigenetic repression
The protein expression level of RAD23B can be epigenetically repressed, either by promoter methylation of the RAD23B gene or by either of two microRNAs (miR-744-3p or miR-373).

Deficiency of RAD23B in cancer
A deficiency in expression of a DNA repair gene increases the risk for cancer (see Deficient DNA repair in carcinogenesis).  The expression of RAD23B is reduced in tumor tissue of women with breast cancer.  A low percentage of RAD23B positive nuclei in high grade breast cancer was also observed.

RAD23B was substantially reduced by promoter methylation in a cell line derived from multiple myeloma. and reduced by promoter methylation in a small proportion of non-small cell lung cancer (NSCLC) tumours.

RAD23B appears to be one of 26 DNA repair genes that are epigenetically repressed in various cancers (see Cancer epigenetics).

Interactions 

RAD23B has been shown to interact with PSMD4 and Ataxin 3.

References

Further reading